Samira Mohamed Ali is a Welsh model, beauty queen, presenter and actress. She has also worked for one of the world's largest banks, HSBC.

Early life
Samira Mohamed Ali (born 15 December 1985) was raised in Abu Dhabi, Dubai with Muhammed, her UAE National father, and Helena, her mother, who originated from Portimao, Portugal. She has a brother called Hamad Mohamed Ali and a half sister, Amira Jones. The family moved to Neath, South Wales, UK when Samira was an early teenager. Ali completed most of her studies, being a keen academic, and excelling in her studies, she gained 11 GCSEs and was one of the youngest bankers in the UK to pass the mortgage exams. At the age of 22, Ali worked for HSBC, interviewing top banking leaders and directors at Canary Wharf.

Acting
Ali is currently focused on her acting career. In 2012 she was involved in a horror film entitled Spirital Phantoma and she later appeared in the 2013 film Molly Crows. Ali was nominated for an award (still pending) at the Cannes Film Festival for her role as an alcoholic mother in Molly Crows. On 2 April 2013 it was officially announced that Ali was to be a part of a Doctor Who fan film which will tie in with the 50th Anniversary of the show. Samira Mohamed Ali worked in two Indian film- Badshah  and B positive.

Filmography

Film

References

External links 
 
 
 Facebook page

1985 births
Living people
People from Neath
People from Dubai
Welsh film actresses
Welsh television personalities
Emigrants from the United Arab Emirates to the United Kingdom